

Events

January–March 
 January 15 – The French newspaper Le Figaro begins publication in Paris, initially as a weekly.
 January 30 – The Menai Suspension Bridge, built by engineer Thomas Telford, is opened between the island of Anglesey and the mainland of Wales.
 February 8 – Unitarian Bernardino Rivadavia becomes the first President of Argentina.
 February 11
 University College London is founded, under the name University of London.
 Swaminarayan writes the Shikshapatri, an important text within Swaminarayan Hinduism.
 February 13 – The American Temperance Society is founded.
 February 23 – Russian Mathematician Nikolai Ivanovich Lobachevsky develops non-Euclidian geometry (independently of Janos Bolyai).
 February 24 – The Treaty of Yandabo ends the First Anglo-Burmese War; Britain gains Assam, Manipur, Rakhine and Tanintharyi.
 March 1 – Chunee the elephant is put to death in London.  After arsenic and shooting fail, he is killed with a sword.
 March 10 – João VI, King of Portugal and the former Emperor of Brazil, dies after a short illness that had started six days earlier, after he had been served dinner while visiting Jerónimos Monastery.  An investigative autopsy 174 years later will discover that he had been killed by arsenic poisoning.  King João's son, Emperor Pedro I of Brazil, sails back to Portugal and briefly reigns as King Pedro IV, before turning over the Portuguese throne to his daughter, Maria.

April–June 
 April 1 – Samuel Morey patents an internal combustion engine in the United States.
 April 10 – The Third Siege of Missolonghi ends, with the massacre of thousands of Greek defenders by the Ottoman besiegers.
 May 28 – Pedro I of Brazil abdicates as King of Portugal.
 June – Photography: Nicéphore Niépce makes a true photograph.
 June 14–15 – The Auspicious Incident: Mahmud II, sultan of Ottoman Empire, crushes the last mutiny of janissaries in Istanbul.
 June 21 – Greek War of Independence: The attempted Ottoman–Egyptian invasion of Mani begins.
 June 22 – The Pan-American Congress of Panama tries (unsuccessfully) to unify the republics of the Americas.

July–September 
 July – Ludwig van Beethoven puts the finishing touches on the String Quartet in C sharp Minor, Opus 131, the jewel in the crown of his late string quartets.
 July 4 – Former U.S. Presidents Thomas Jefferson and John Adams both die on the 50th anniversary of the signing of the United States Declaration of Independence.
 July 26 – Cayetano Ripoll becomes the last person to be executed by the Spanish Inquisition at its last auto-da-fé, held in Valencia.
 August – The town of Crawford Notch, New Hampshire suffers a landslide; those killed include the Willey Family, after whom Mount Willey is named.
 August 10 – The first Cowes Regatta is held on the Isle of Wight, in the U.K.
 August 18 – Explorer Alexander Gordon Laing becomes the first European to reach Timbuktu.
 September 21 – Construction of the Rideau Canal begins in Canada.
 September – William Morgan (anti-Mason) of Batavia, New York, disappears mysteriously. It is highly likely he was murdered by freemasons.

October–December 
 October 1 – The Monkland and Kirkintilloch Railway opens in Scotland.
 October 7 – The first train operates over the Granite Railway in Massachusetts.
 November 3 – The Paris Stock Exchange opens at the Palais de la Bourse.
 December 16 – Benjamin W. Edwards rides into Mexican-controlled Nacogdoches, Texas, and declares himself ruler of the Republic of Fredonia.
 December 21 – Fredonian Rebellion: American settlers in Mexican Texas make the first attempt to secede from Mexico, establishing the Republic of Fredonia, which will survive for just over a month.
 December 25
 The Eggnog Riot breaks out at the United States Military Academy in West Point, New York during the early morning hours.
 Major Edmund Lockyer arrives at King George Sound, to take possession of the western part of Australia, establishing a settlement near Albany.

Date unknown 
 The first railway tunnel is built en route between Liverpool and Manchester, in England.
 The British East India Company colony of the Straits Settlements is established.
 Aniline is first isolated from the destructive distillation of indigo, by Otto Unverdorben.
 Ludwig van Beethoven composes the Große Fuge.
 Mahmud II's council orders the janissaries to drill in the European manner.

Births

January–June 

 January 1 – Mikhail Loris-Melikov, Russian statesman, general (d. 1888)
 January 12 – William Chapman Ralston, American banker, financier (d. 1875)
 January 15 – Marie Pasteur, French chemist (d. 1910)
 January 24 – William Daniel, American temperance movement leader (d. 1897)
 January 26 – Louis Favre, Swiss engineer (d. 1879)
 January 27
 Mikhail Saltykov-Shchedrin, Russian writer (d. 1889)
 Richard Taylor, American Confederate general (d. 1879)
 January 30 – Robert F. R. Lewis, American naval officer (d. 1881)
 February 3 – Walter Bagehot, English economist and journalist (d. 1877)
 February 7 – James Edward Jouett, American admiral (d. 1902)
 February 9 – John A. Logan, American soldier, political leader (d. 1886)
 February 15 – George Johnstone Stoney, Anglo-Irish physicist (d. 1911)
 February 16
 Hans Peter Jørgen Julius Thomsen, Danish chemist (d. 1909)
 Joseph Victor von Scheffel, German poet (d. 1886)
 Julia Grant, First Lady of the United States (d. 1902)
 March 3 – Joseph Wharton, American industrialist (d. 1909)
 March 4
 John Buford, American general (d. 1863)
 Theodore Judah, American railroad engineer (d. 1863)
 March 24 – Matilda Joslyn Gage, American feminist (d. 1898)
 March 29 – Wilhelm Liebknecht, German journalist, politician (d. 1900)
 April 3 
 Cyrus K. Holliday, cofounder of Topeka, Kansas, first president of the Atchison, Topeka and Santa Fe Railway (d. 1900)
 Reginald Heber, English priest (b. 1783)
 April 6 – Gustave Moreau, French painter (d. 1898)
 May 3 – King Charles XV of Sweden and Norway (d. 1872)
 May 4 – Frederic Edwin Church, American painter (d. 1900)
 May 7 – Varina Davis, First Lady of the Confederate States of America (d. 1906)
 May 8 – Miguel Ângelo Lupi, Portuguese painter (d. 1883)
 May 24 – Marie Goegg-Pouchoulin, Swiss international women's rights activist, pacifist  (d. 1899)
 May 26 – Richard Christopher Carrington, English astronomer (d. 1875)
 May 28 – Benjamin Gratz Brown, American politician (d. 1885)
 June 24 – George Goyder, surveyor-general of South Australia (d. 1898)
 June 26 – Warren F. Daniell, American politician (d. 1913)
 June 30 – Ozra Amander Hadley, American politician (d. 1915)

July–December 

 July 4
 Stephen Foster, American songwriter, poet (d. 1864)
 Green Clay Smith, American temperance movement leader (d. 1895)
 July 8 – Benjamin Grierson, American Civil War general (d. 1911)
 July 31 – William S. Clark, American chemist, 3rd President of the Massachusetts Agricultural College (d. 1886)
 August 7 – August Ahlqvist, Finnish professor, poet, scholar of the Finno-Ugric languages, author, and literary critic (d. 1889)
 August 11 – Andrew Jackson Davis, American spiritualist (d. 1910)
 August 21 – Karl Gegenbaur, German anatomist, professor (d. 1903) 
 September 8 – Sir James Corry, 1st Baronet, British politician (d. 1891)
 September 17 – Bernhard Riemann, German mathematician (d. 1866)
 October 8 – Emily Blackwell, American physician (d. 1910)
 November 24 – Carlo Collodi, Italian writer (d. 1890)
 November 27 – Jonathan Young, United States Navy commodore (d. 1885)
 December 3 – George B. McClellan, American general, politician (d. 1885)
December 8 - John Brown, Scottish personal servant and favourite of Queen Victoria (d. 1883)

Date unknown 
 Cetshwayo kaMpande, Zulu king (d. 1884)

Deaths

January–June 

 January 3
 Marie Le Masson Le Golft, French naturalist (b. 1750)
 Louis-Gabriel Suchet, French marshal (b. 1770)
 January 17 – Juan Crisóstomo Arriaga, Spanish composer (b. 1806)
 January 23 – Abraham Woodhull, Patriot spy during the American Revolutionary War (b. 1750)
 February 17 – John Manners-Sutton, British politician (b. 1752)
 March 10 – King John VI of Portugal (b. 1767)
 March 29 – Johann Heinrich Voss, German poet (b. 1751)
 April 11 – Anton Walter, Austrian piano maker (b. 1752)
 April 25 – Karl Ludwig von Phull, German military leader (b. 1757)
 May 4 – Sebastián Kindelán y O'Regan, Spanish colonial governor in Cuba (b. 1757)
 May 7 – Sophie Hagman, Swedish ballerina, royal mistress (b. 1758)
 May 16
 Empress Elizabeth Alexeievna, consort of Alexander I of Russia (b. 1779)
 Joseph Holt, 1798 United Irish rebel general (b. 1756)
 June 3 – Nikolay Karamzin, Russian language reformer (b. 1766)
 June 5 – Carl Maria von Weber, German composer (b. 1786)
 June 7 – Joseph von Fraunhofer, German optician (b. 1787)

July–December 

 July 4
 John Adams, 90, 2nd President of the United States (b. 1735)
 Thomas Jefferson, 83, 3rd President of the United States (b. 1743)
 July 5
 Joseph Proust, French chemist (b. 1754)
 Stamford Raffles, British colonial governor, founder of Singapore (b. 1781)
 July 8 – Luther Martin, delegate to the American Constitutional Convention (b. 1746)
 July 22 – Giuseppe Piazzi, Italian astronomer (b. 1746)
 July 25 – Sergey Muravyov-Apostol, Russian Army officer (b. 1796)
 July 26 – James Winchester, American general and politician (b. 1752)
 August 2 – George Finch, 9th Earl of Winchilsea, English cricketer (b. 1752)
 August 13 – René Laennec, French physician (b. 1781)
 August 15 – Hanne Tott, Danish circus artist, manager (b. 1771)
 August 28 – Józef Zajączek, Polish general, politician (b. 1752)
 September 7 – Robert Wright (politician), American politician (b. 1752)
 September 12 – Eliphalet Pearson, American educator (b. 1752)
 October 25 – Philippe Pinel, French physician (b. 1745)
 November 17 –  Caroline Müller, Danish opera singer (b. 1755)
 November 23 – Johann Elert Bode, German astronomer (b. 1747)
 December 11 – Queen-Empress Maria Leopoldina, consort of Pedro IV of Portugal & I of Brazil (b. 1797)

References